Musawa is a Local Government Area in Katsina State, Nigeria. Its headquarters are in the town of Musawa.

The postal code of the area is 833.

References

Local Government Areas in Katsina State